Severo Muguerza (1883–1952?) was a composer of Spanish, Basque, Neapolitan zarzuelas and operettas. He was born in San Sebastián, Spain, and lived his later years in Cuba, Venezuela, and Mexico.

Career 
Among his earliest works are La melindrosa (lyrics by Enrique F. Gutiérrez-Roig and Luis Gabaldón) and performed at the Teatro de la Latino in Madrid, April 15, 1921, and El príncipe azul, a comic opera in one act (lyrics by Julio Torres and Rafael Robledo) and performed at the Teatro Ruzafa, in Valencia, Spain, on December 14, 1923.

On November 8, 1931, he directed an operetta at the Teatro Nacional, in which Caridad Suárez Valdés interpreted the role of 'Valencienne' in the La viuda alegre, alongside Esperanza Iris as ‘Ana de Glavary’, Manolo Villa as ‘Danilo’ and Panchito Naya as ‘Rosillón’. Muguerza directed Los diamantes de la corona at the Teatro Nacional January 30, 1932, with Panchito Naya, Estelita Echazábal and Paco Salas.

Leaving prior to the beginning of Spain's civil war (1936–39), Severo traveled to Latin America with Palmira Tomas, an opera singer from Barcelona, and her sister Carmen, also a soprano star, to Caracas, Venezuela; Cuba; and later Mexico, settling in Cuernavaca.

Spain's civil war (July 18, 1936 to April 1, 1939) changed Mexico's cultural life overnight. The civil war killed millions and brought thousands of intellectuals, musicians, and actors to Argentina, Colombia, Venezuela, and Mexico. Spanish musicians and actors joined Mexico's golden age of cinema, contributing themes based on civil war and injustice.

Severo Muguerza along with Antonio Díaz Conde, Gustavo Pittaluga, and Rodolfo Halffer wrote film scores for Venezuela's and Mexico's film industry between 1940 and 1945. Severo composed movie scores for Destino de Mujer (1934) filmed in Venezuela and The Eternal Secret (1942), Una Gitana en Mexico (1945), and Adultery (1945) filmed in Mexico.

Personal life 
In Spain Muguerza married María Berri, with whom he had two children, actress Esperanza Muguerza Berri, who later married actor Carlos Lemos, and Virgilio Muguerza y Berri who was born in Arroyo Naranjo, La Habana, Cuba, April 14, 1910.

On May 2, 1919, Severo departed from San Juan, Puerto Rico, for La Guaya, Venezuela, on the SS Julia.  He listed his age as 34 and residence as Spain. On May 29, 1930, Severo again sailed from San Juan, Puerto Rico bound for Santiago de Cuba on the SS Presidente Machado.  At this time he listed his residence as Curacao.  On April 17, 1933, he listed his residence as Havana, Cuba, and obtained an immigration permit to sail on the SS Presidente Machado from Santiago de Cuba to Puerto Rico and arrived on April 24, 1933.

In Mexico Muguerza married Palmira Tomas, and reported that his address was Caracas, Venezuela. On the marriage certificate, Palmira Tomas stated that she was from Barcelona, Spain, but her current address was Aldaco 8, Mexico City.  Presiding over the wedding were Rosario Martin from Santander, Spain, and her husband Amador Perez from Asturias, Spain.  At the time of her marriage Palmira Tomas had a son named Gustavo Muguerza Tomas who was later adopted by Severo Muguerza. His father was a Czechoslovakian named Sedergreg who had been killed while on a boat transporting refugees during World War II.  Her son Gustavo Muguerza Tomas married Carmen Perez, the daughter of Rosario and Amador, and a school administrator in Mexico City's public schools.  Palmira's son became a traveling Laggs tea salesman during the 1960s–70s and had two sons, architect Gustavo Muguerza Perez (1947–2015) and Eduardo Muguerza (1948–) Perez.

Severo Muguerza died of diabetes around 1952 at the Sanatorio Español in Mexico City.

References

1883 births
1950s deaths
Spanish male composers
Spanish opera composers
People from San Sebastián
20th-century Spanish male musicians
Spanish emigrants to Mexico